Ram Krishna Dwarika College, Patna is a degree college in Bihar, India. It is a constituent unit of Patliputra University. College offers Senior secondary education and Undergraduate degree in Arts, Science and conducts some vocational courses.

History 
College was established in 1964. The foundation of the college was laid down by Late Rao Birendra Singh, former Chief Minister of Haryana on 7 March 1964 at Punaichak, Patna. College became functional on 7 March 1975 at Punaichak. The present campus of the college has been donated by Late Shiv Naryan Ray and the college shifted on its present site in 1980. College became the constituent unit of Magadh University in 1986.

It became a constituent unit of Patliputra University in 2018.

Degrees and courses 
College offers the following degrees and courses.

 Senior Secondary
 Intermediate of Arts
 Intermediate of Science
 Bachelor's degree
 Bachelor of Arts
 Bachelor of Science
 Vocational courses
 Bachelor of Computer Application
 Bachelor of Business Management
 Bachelor of Science in Information Technology
 Travel and Tour Management
 Advertising, Sales promotion & sales Management

References

External links 

 Official website of college
 Patliputra University website

Constituent colleges of Patliputra University
Educational institutions established in 1964
Universities and colleges in Patna
1964 establishments in Bihar
Patna district